Kore Ga Mayaku Da is an album by Afrirampo, released on John Zorn's Tzadik label. The title translates to "This is a poison."

Track listing

 "I Did Are" - 13:37
 "O" - 2:35
 "Kairaku Do Re Mi" - 1:22
 "Want You" - 	4:04
 "I Am Bird" - 1:40
 "Pekkopa in Brooklyn" - 1:51
 "Nakimushikemushi Good Bye!" - 7:59
 "Kui! Kui!" - 1:24
 "On Ska to Paar Ya" - 5:06
 "Hadaka" - 9:17
 "Matane ♂" - 1:13

Personnel
Oni: Guitar, Voice
Pikachu: Drums, Voice

References

2005 albums
Afrirampo albums
Tzadik Records albums